Joseph R. Berger (born April 19, 1951) is an American internist and neurologist who is known for his research interests in progressive multifocal leukoencephalopathy (PML), the neurological complications of HIV/AIDS, multiple sclerosis, and other inflammatory disorders of the brain. Particularly, he contributed research on why PML occurs more frequently in AIDS than in other immunosuppressive conditions.

He has also made substantial contributions to the understanding of the spectrum of neurological complications that accompany HIV infection occurring as a consequence of the direct effects of the HIV on the central and peripheral nervous systems and those that result from the accompanying immunosuppression of AIDS. Berger is the discoverer of the value of the anabolic steroid oxandrolone in the treatment of AIDS wasting and AIDS myopathy. He is the recipient of the 2015 Pioneer in NeuroVirology award of the International Society for NeuroVirology., the 2014 Raymond D. Adams Lectureship, the 2015 Distinguished Teaching Award from the American Neurological Association  ; and the 2018 Alumni Achievement Award from the Sidney Kimmel College, Thomas Jefferson University.

Career and Education

Berger graduated from Susquehanna Township High School in Harrisburg, PA, in 1969 and was  a summa cum laude graduate of the Pennsylvania State University (1972) – Jefferson Medical College (1974) Five-Year Accelerated Medical Program. He completed his residency in internal medicine at Georgetown University Hospital and his neurology residency at the University of Miami School of Medicine.

In 1981, Berger joined the faculty of the University of Miami School of Medicine, serving in the departments of both neurology and internal medicine. At that institution, he held the Whigham-Berger Endowed Chair for the study of the neurological complications of HIV/AIDS.  He is a fellow of the American Academy of Neurology, the American Neurological Association, and the American College of Physicians.

From 1995 through 2014, he was chairman of the Department of Neurology at the University of Kentucky College of Medicine, where he held the Ruth L. Works Professorship and was director of the Multiple Sclerosis Clinic and the Neuro-AIDS Program.

Berger worked in international outreach programs- as he ran a conference for the United Nations and Mother and Children's African Relief Organization in Addis Ababa, Ethiopia in 1999.

In 2014, he joined the faculty of the Perelman School of Medicine, University of Pennsylvania, as professor of neurology and was chief of the Multiple Sclerosis Division from 2014 through 2019. 

Berger is the case-report editor of the Journal of NeuroVirology and serves or has served on other editorial boards. He co-founded the International Neuroscience of HIV meeting with Dr. Robert Levy, and has served in numerous administrative capacities for the American Neurological Association and the American Academy of Neurology.

Publications
Berger has published more than 275 refereed papers, more than 100 chapters, and has co-edited four textbooks,  The preponderance of his published work has focused on the progressive multifocal leukoencephalopathy, the neurological complications of HIV/AIDS and other infectious diseases, and multiple sclerosis and related inflammatory conditions; however, his contributions address a large number of other neurological conditions.

Media Appearances 
Berger has appeared in lectures and on PBS news regarding the affects on the brain of Covid-19, as well other issues such as the need for more neurologists and artificial intelligence usefulness in neurology:

References

External links
 Department of Neurology University of Kentucky
Professor of Neurology at the Hospital of the University of Pennsylvania

American medical researchers
Georgetown University people
University of Kentucky faculty
HIV/AIDS researchers
American neurologists
Living people
1951 births